Livity is a 1981 reggae album by Prince Far I. Livity is a word used by Rastafarians to refer to the energy or life-force that flows through all living things. The album is generally considered one of Prince Far I's weaker albums. As on many of his albums, the backing comes from the Roots Radics, under the guise of The Arabs. The album was mixed by Lancelot "Maxie" McKenzie.

Track listing
"Reggae Music Moving"
"Badda Card"                           
"Some With Roof"                        
"Marble Stone"                         
"Put It Out"                          
"King Of Kings"
"River Jordan"
"Ghetto Living"
"Give Me For My Continent"
"Wish I Have A Wing"

References

External links
Livity at Roots Archives

Prince Far I albums
1981 albums